Penarth is an unincorporated community in New Castle County, Delaware, United States,  northeast of Wilmington in the Brandywine Hundred. Penarth is located west of the intersection of Delaware Route 261 and Silverside Road, east of Talleyville.

References 

Unincorporated communities in New Castle County, Delaware
Unincorporated communities in Delaware